Placedo Creek is a  stream in Victoria County and Calhoun County, Texas, in the United States. It flows to Lavaca Bay.

The stream was named after Plácido Benavides, a pioneer settler.

See also
List of rivers of Texas

References

Rivers of Calhoun County, Texas
Rivers of Victoria County, Texas
Rivers of Texas